XEANAH-AM is a radio station in Huixquilucan, State of Mexico, Mexico and is the radio station of the Anahuac University Network. It broadcasts on 1670 AM from studios on the university campus.

The station began AM transmissions on January 20, 2011, though it had existed as an Internet radio station since 2004.

External links
Radio Anáhuac Facebook

References

2011 establishments in Mexico
Radio stations established in 2011
Radio stations in the State of Mexico
Spanish-language radio stations
University radio stations in Mexico